The lands inhabited by indigenous peoples receive different treatments around the world. Many countries have specific legislation, definitions, nomenclature, objectives, etc., for such lands. To protect indigenous land rights, special rules are sometimes created to protect the areas they live in. In other cases, governments establish "reserves" with the intention of segregation. Some indigenous peoples live in places where their right to land is not recognised, or not effectively protected.

By country

In Australia
 Indigenous Protected Areas
 Torres Strait Regional Authority (de facto autonomous region)
Northern Peninsula Area Region
Indigenous Local government areas (LGA) of Queensland
Wujal Wujal Aboriginal Shire
Aboriginal Shire of Cherbourg
 Aboriginal Shire of Woorabinda
Aboriginal Shire of Palm Island
Aboriginal Shire of Hope Vale
Aboriginal Shire of Kowanyama
Aboriginal Shire of Lockhart River
Aboriginal Shire of Mapoon
Aboriginal Shire of Napranum
Aboriginal Shire of Pormpuraaw
Aboriginal Shire of Yarrabah
Aboriginal Shire of Doomadgee
Aboriginal land councils in the Northern Territory
Anindilyakawa Land Council
Central Land Council
Northern Land Council
Tiwi Land Council
Bagot Aboriginal Community(Bagot Aboriginal Reserve)

In Bangladesh
Chittagong Hill Tracts
Bohmong Circle
Chakma Circle
Mong Circle

In Belize

Aguacate Indian Reservation, Toledo
Black Creek Indian Reservation, Toledo
Blue Creek Indian Reservation, Toledo
Crique Sarco Indian Reservation, Toledo
Graham Creek Indian Reservation, Toledo
Hinchasones Indian Reservation, Toledo
Machaca Indian Reservation, Toledo
Xpicilha Indian Reservation, Toledo

In Bolivia
:es:Autonomía indígena originario campesina

 Native Community Lands

In Botswana
 New Xade, a village established as an indigenous reservation for Khoe-speaking San (Bushmen) ethnic groups and other first peoples relocated from their traditional lands on the Central Kalahari Game Reserve (CKGR).The primary ethnic groups residing in the settlement are the G/ui (Dcuikhoe), G//ana (Dxanakhoe), and Bakgalagadi.
Kaudwane, another village established as an indigenous reservation for indigenous San ethnic groups relocated from the Central Kalahari Game Reserve.
A smaller number of indigenous San peoples were also relocated to the villages of Bere, Chobokwane and New Xanagas

In Brazil
 Terras Indígenas, in the wide sense
 Terras indígenas, in the strict sense
 Terras reservadas (reserva indígena, parque indígena, colônia agrícola indígena e território federal indígena)
 Terras dominiais

In Canada
 Indian reserves, or First Nation reserves (Canada-wide)
 Nunavut, a federal territory open to non-natives but Inuit-majority
 Inuvialuit Settlement Region, established by the federal government and lying within Yukon and the Northwest Territories, co-managed with the Inuvialuit
Unique to each province:
 Aboriginal villages and territories, Quebec
 Métis Settlements, Alberta
 Nunatsiavut, Newfoundland and Labrador

Central African Republic
Dzanga-Sangha Special Reserve, a forest reserve established to protect wildlife and the indigenous Baka Pygmies communities of Bayanga, Moussapoula, Kunda, Papaye and Yobe.

In China
 Autonomous administrative divisions of China
Tibet Autonomous Region (Xizang Autonomous Region)
Xinjiang Uygur Autonomous Region (XUAR)
Ningxia Hui Autonomous Region (NHAR)
Inner Mongolia Autonomous Region
Guangxi Zhuang Autonomous Region (GZAR)
30 Autonomous prefectures
117 Autonomous counties
3 Autonomous banners

In Colombia
Indigenous reserves in Colombia
Territorios indígenas
 Resguardo indígena

In Costa Rica
Indigenous territories of Costa Rica
Boruca Indian Reservation
Guaymi Indian Reservation
Horse Treks and Guayami Indian Reservation

In Denmark
 Kalaallit Nunaat, an autonomous territory

In Dominica
Carib Territory

In Finland and Scandinavia
Sámi Domicile Area
Sápmi

In Guyana
 Epira Amerindian District (East Berbice-Corentyne Area)
 Epira Amerindian Reservation (East Berbice-Corentyne Area)
 Kanuku Amerindian District (Upper Takutu-Upper Essequibo Area)
 Karasabai Amerindian District (Upper Takutu-Upper Essequibo Area)
 Orealla Amerindian District (East Berbice-Corentyne Area)
 Orealla Amerindian Reservation (East Berbice-Corentyne Area)
 Pomeroon-Ituribisi Amerindian District (Pomeroon-Supenaam Area)
 Pomeroon-Ituribisi Indian Reservation (Pomeroon-Supenaam Area)
 Pomeroon-Ituribisi Reservation (Pomeroon-Supenaam Area)
 Saint Francis Amerindian District Guyana Area)
 Santa Amerindian District (Essequibo Islands-West Demerara Area)
 Wikki Amerindian District (Upper Demerara-Berbice Area)
 Wikki Amerindian Reservation (Upper Demerara-Berbice Area)
 Wikki Indian Reservation (Upper Demerara-Berbice Area)

In Hong Kong
Indigenous villages of the New Territories, there are 586 villages recognized as indigenous by the Small House Policy which are represented by 27 rural committees. The largest indigenous group is the Hakka followed by Tanka, Hoklo and Weitou peoples. 

Cheung Chau Rural Committee
Fanling District Rural Committee
Ha Tsuen Rural Committee
Hang Hau Rural Committee
Lamma Island (North) Rural Committee
Lamma Island (South) Rural Committee
Kam Tin Rural Committee
Ma Wan Rural Committee
Mui Wo Rural Committee
Pat Heung Rural Committee
Peng Chau Rural Committee
Ping Shan Rural Committee
Sai Kung North Rural Committee
Sai Kung Rural Committee
San Tin Rural Committee
Sha Tau Kok District Rural Committee
Sha Tin Rural Committee
Shap Pat Heung Rural Committee
Sheung Shui District Rural Committee
South Lantao Rural Committee
Ta Kwu Ling District Rural Committee
Tai O Rural Committee
Tai Po Rural Committee
Tsing Yi Rural Committee
Tuen Mun Rural Committee
Tung Chung Rural Committee
Tsuen Wan Rural Committee

Frontier Closed Area, a restricted border zone in Hong Kong on the border with Mainland China populated by a number of indigenous Hakka villages.Since non-residents require a special Closed Area Permit to enter the FCA, the area effectively functions as a protected indigenous reservation for the Hakka and Tanka inhabitants.
Lok Ma Chau
Ta Kwu Leng 
Sha Tau Kok
Chung Ying Street District

In India
29 Autonomous district councils
Bodoland Territorial Council
North Cachar Hills Autonomous Council
Karbi Anglong Autonomous Council
Tiwa Autonomous Council
Mising Autonomous Council
Rabha Hasong Autonomous Council
Sonowal Kachari Autonomous Council
Thengal Kachari Autonomous Council
Deori Autonomous Council
Moran Autonomous Council
Matak Autonomous Council
Bodo Kachari Welfare Autonomous Council
Kamatapur Autonomous Council
Northeast India
North Sentinel Island, a de facto self-governing island located in the Union Territory of Andaman and Nicobar Islands inhabited by the uncontacted Sentinelese people
South India
Adivasi and India tribal belt

In Japan
Hokkaido
Okinawa Prefecture

In the Middle East
Israel
Kurdistan
Iranian Kurdistan
Kurdistan Region (Iraq)
Rojava (Syria)
Turkish Kurdistan
Nineveh (Iraq)
Palestine
Tamazgha
Darfur

In New Zealand
Cook Islands (Rarotonga)
Niue
Tokelau

In Pakistan
Federally Administered Tribal Areas

In Panama
Emberá-Wounaan
Guna Yala
Guna de Madungandí
Guna de Wargandí
Naso Tjër Di
Ngäbe-Buglé

In Peru
Communal reserves are conservation areas for flora and fauna, allowing traditional use for the rural populations surrounding the areas. The use and marketing of the natural resources within the communal reserve is conducted by the same rural populations.

In the Philippines
 Bangsamoro
 Cordillera Administrative Region

In Russia
Autonomous okrugs of Russia
National raions of Russia
Republics of Russia
Territory of Traditional Natural Resource Use

In South Africa
!Ae!Hai Heritage Park
San Heritage Land
Mier Heritage Land

In Sri Lanka
Eastern Province
Northern Province

In Taiwan
 Indigenous Areas

In Ukraine
 Crimea

In United States
 Indian reservations
  Alaska Native villages
 Hawaiian Homelands
 American Samoa
Swains Island
Northern Mariana Islands

Conservation of nature
Some lands inhabited for indigenous peoples can be considered as Indigenous and Community Conserved Area.

See also
 Indigenous land rights
 Struggle for the Land

References

External links
 Map "Amazon 2012 Protected Areas and Indigenous Territories"
 Карты резервации Колумбии
 BIA map of Indian reservations in the continental United States
 Convenio 169 de la OIT, Survival International
 Territorio Indígena y Gobernanza (in spanish)
 world indigenous territory map